Denise Kanstrup Dupont (born 24 May 1984) is a Danish curler. She throws third rocks for the Danish national team, skipped by Angelina Jensen.

After several years of limited success in the Junior ranks, Dupont joined Dorthe Holm's team and was a member of the silver medal-winning European Curling Championships team in 2002. (Throwing second rocks). The following year, the team won a bronze medal. Her success at the European Championships never translated to Junior success or World Championship success at the time. In 2004, she was promoted to the third position, and the team won another bronze at the European Championships in 2005. She played third in the 2006 Olympics in Torino, Italy, where they finished 9th — following that, she left the team and joined up with Jensen. The new team succeeded at the 2007 World Women's Curling Championship, where they won silver. Denise Dupont returned to the world championships in 2008, where she played third for Angelina Jensen, finishing fifth after losing a tiebreaker to Japan's Moe Meguro.

Personal life
Dupont was born in Copenhagen and lives in Dragør. She is employed as a teacher and has two children.  She is the sister of teammate Madeleine Dupont. She competed in the 2015 World Mixed Doubles Curling Championship with brother Oliver Dupont, just before that they also won 2015 Danish Mixed Doubles Curling Championship.

Teammates 
2007 Aomori World Championships

2008 Vernon World Championships

2009 Gangneung World Championships

Curling at the 2010 Winter Olympics 2010

Madeleine Dupont, Fourth

Angelina Jensen, Skip

Camilla Jensen, Lead

Ane Hansen, Alternate

References

External links
 
 2010 Olympics profile 

Danish female curlers
1984 births
Living people
Olympic curlers of Denmark
Curlers at the 2006 Winter Olympics
Curlers at the 2010 Winter Olympics
Curlers at the 2018 Winter Olympics
Curlers at the 2022 Winter Olympics
People from Dragør Municipality
Sportspeople from Copenhagen
Danish educators
21st-century Danish women